William Edwin Harvey (5 September 1852 – 28 April 1914), known as W. E. Harvey, was a British Lib-Lab Member of Parliament.

Born in Hasland, Derbyshire, Harvey worked in a coal mine from the age of ten.  He joined the South Yorkshire Miners' Association (SYMA) in 1869, and was the union's local delegate by 1872.  For his trade union activity, he was dismissed from the local pit, but managed to find work at Sheepbridge, then later at Morton.  He also converted to Primitive Methodism and in his spare time was a lay preacher.

In 1880, the Derbyshire-based members of the SYMA split away to form the Derbyshire Miners' Association (DMA), and Harvey became the new union's first treasurer.  He resigned in 1882, because union meetings clashed with cricket matches for his employer's team.  However, the following year, he was elected as the union's assistant secretary.  In 1891, he was elected to the national executive of the Miners' Federation of Great Britain (MFGB), serving on it in most subsequent years, and in 1894 he was the President of Chesterfield Trades Council.

Politically a liberal, strongly opposed to socialism and syndicalism, Harvey became the vice-president of the Labour Electoral Association in 1894.  This organisation aimed to secure the election of workers under the auspices of the Liberal Party, and Harvey was elected to Chesterfield Borough Council in 1897, serving until his death.

In 1906, Harvey became financial and corresponding secretary of the DMA, and his high-profile secured him the Liberal Party candidacy in the 1907 North East Derbyshire by-election.  He was successful, and reluctantly joined the Labour Party in 1910, on the instructions of his union.  Despite his seat in Parliament, he remained an active trade unionist, serving as Vice-President of the MFGB from 1912, and as General and Financial Secretary of the DMA from 1913.

Harvey became increasingly unhappy with how the Labour party was behaving towards the issue of Miners' representation. In particular he was unhappy with the way Barnet Kenyon was treated during and after the 1913 Chesterfield by-election. He therefore decided to resign the Labour whip and re-took the Liberal whip on 30 March 1914. He died, aged 61, almost a month later.

References

1852 births
1914 deaths
British coal miners
Councillors in Derbyshire
Members of the Parliament of the United Kingdom for constituencies in Derbyshire
Miners' Federation of Great Britain-sponsored MPs
Liberal-Labour (UK) MPs
Labour Party (UK) MPs for English constituencies
UK MPs 1906–1910
UK MPs 1910
UK MPs 1910–1918
Vice Presidents of the National Union of Mineworkers (Great Britain)
English miners
People from Hasland